Christian Saceanu (born 8 July 1968) is a retired tennis player from Germany, who turned professional in 1986. The right-hander won two singles titles (1988, Bristol and 1991, Rosmalen) in his career. Saceanu reached his highest singles ATP-ranking in March 1988 when he became the number 60 of the world.

He began playing tennis when he was nine. He was ranked No. 1 in the Romanian 14s and one year later moved with his family to West Germany where he won the German national singles title in 1986. In that same year he was ranked No. 1 in the 18s.

Career finals

Singles

References

External links
 
 

1968 births
Living people
German male tennis players
Romanian emigrants to Germany
Sportspeople from Cluj-Napoca
West German male tennis players